Kurzer Prozess is a 1967 German crime film directed by Michael Kehlmann.

Cast 
 Helmut Qualtinger - Inspektor Pokorny
 Gudrun Thielemann - Karin Nieburg
 Alexander Kerst - Wolfert
 Bruni Löbel - Fräulein Schebesta
 Franz Stoss - Ministerialrat Gassinger
 Kurt Sowinetz - Wokupetz
  - Frau Nagler
 Walter Kohut - Herr Nagler
 Hertha Martin - Frau Janisch
 Willy Harlander - Polizeibeamter Janisch
 Siegfried Breuer Jr. - Vogel
 Fritz Eckhardt - Raimond Höfler
  - Stefanitsch

References

External links 

1967 films
1967 crime films
German crime films
West German films
Police detective films
Films set in Austria
Films based on British novels
1960s German films